Turgay Tanülkü (born 18 July 1953) is a Turkish actor.

Selected filmography

References

External links
 

1953 births
Living people
Turkish male film actors